"Last Time" is the third single from R&B recording artist Trey Songz's album Trey Day. The single debuted at number 118 on the US R&B chart on its second week of release.

Chart performance
Last Time has become Trey Songz second consecutive top-ten R&B hit, with "Can't Help But Wait" peaking at number two and "Last Time" peaking at number nine.

Charts

Weekly charts

Year-end charts

References

2007 songs
2008 singles
Trey Songz songs
Atlantic Records singles
Songs written by Bryan-Michael Cox
Songs written by Kendrick Dean
Songs written by Trey Songz